The Arab Scout Region of the World Organization of the Scout Movement has run or sponsored region-wide Arab Scout Jamborees in its member countries. During the 14th World Scout Conference in Liechtenstein in 1953, Syria offered to host the 8th World Scout Jamboree, but was denied after Israel protested that Israeli Scouts couldn't enter Arab countries. The Arab delegations felt that they wouldn't be able to host such international events and decided to organize on the Pan-Arab level. They prepared a draft in March 1954 that was approved by the Arab League Council on its 21st session, establishing the Arab Scout Organization. The first Arab Scout Conference (and Jamboree) was held at Zabadani, Syria in the summer of 1954, where the Arab Scout Committee was formed.

The second conference and jamboree were held at Abu Qir, Egypt in the summer of 1956.

List of Arab Scout Jamborees

External links

References

Scouting jamborees
Scouting-related lists